Viber, or Rakuten Viber, is a cross-platform voice over IP (VoIP) and instant messaging (IM) software application owned by Japanese multinational company Rakuten, provided as freeware for the Google Android, iOS, Microsoft Windows, Apple macOS and Linux platforms.  Users are registered and identified through a cellular telephone number, although the service is accessible on desktop platforms without needing mobile connectivity. In addition to instant messaging it allows users to exchange media such as images and video records, and also provides a paid international landline and mobile calling service called Viber Out. As of 2018, there are over a billion registered users on the network.

The software was developed in 2010 by Cyprus-based Viber Media, which was bought by Rakuten in 2014. Since 2017, its corporate name has been Rakuten Viber. It is based in Cyprus  with offices in London, Manila, Moscow, Paris, San Francisco, Singapore, and Tokyo.

History

Founding (2010) 
Viber Media was founded in Tel Aviv, Israel, in 2010 by Talmon Marco and Igor Magazinnik, who are friends from the Israel Defense Forces where they were chief information officers. Marco and Magazinnik are also co-founders of the P2P media and file-sharing client iMesh. The company was run from Israel, and was registered in Cyprus. Sani Maroli and Ofer Smocha soon joined the company as well. Marco commented that Viber allows instant calling and synchronization with contacts because the ID is the user's cell number.

Early monetisation (2013)
In its first two years of availability, Viber did not generate revenues. It began doing so in 2013, via user payments for Viber Out voice calling and the Viber graphical messaging "sticker market". The company was originally funded by individual investors, described by Marco as "friends and family". They invested $20 million in the company, which had 120 employees .

On 24 July 2013, Viber's support system was defaced by the Syrian Electronic Army. According to Viber, no sensitive user information was accessed.

Rakuten acquires Viber (2014) 
On 13 February 2014, Rakuten announced they had acquired Viber Media for $900 million. The sale of Viber earned the Shabtai family (Benny, his brother Gilad, and Gilad's son Ofer) some $500 million from their 55.2% stake in the company. At that sale price, the founders each realized over 30 times return on their investments.

Djamel Agaoua became Viber Media CEO in February 2017, replacing co-founder Marco who left in 2015.

In July 2017 the corporate name of Viber Media was changed to Rakuten Viber and a new wordmark logo was introduced. Its legal name remains Viber Media, S.à r.l. based in Luxembourg.

Post-acquisition
In 2017, Rakuten Viber and the World Wildlife Fund engaged in a commercial transaction aimed at raising awareness and protecting wildlife.

After first using RV to spread its message in June 2020, the International Federation of the Red Cross launched an official chatbot and Community on the messaging app to combat the spread of false information, which they termed an infodemic, about COVID-19. The chatbot is still active as of June 2022, with over 1.4 million subscribers.

In 2020, Rakuten Viber and the World Health Organization (the WHO) engaged in a commercial transaction for a chatbot to inform users of issues such as women's health. and an anti-smoking campaign.

In the wake of the July–August 2020 Belarusian election protests and ensuing crackdown, the company closed its office in Minsk.

Security audit 
On 4 November 2014, Viber scored 1 out of 7 points on the Electronic Frontier Foundation's "Secure Messaging Scorecard". Viber received a point for encryption during transit but lost points because communications were not encrypted with keys that the provider did not have access to (i.e. the communications were not end-to-end encrypted), users could not verify contacts' identities, past messages were not secure if the encryption keys were stolen (i.e. the service did not provide forward secrecy), the code was not open to independent review (i.e. the code was not open-source), the security design was not properly documented, and there had not been a recent independent security audit. On 14 November 2014, the EFF changed Viber's score to 2 out of 7 after it had received an external security audit from Ernst & Young's Advanced Security Centre.

On 19 April 2016, with the announcement of Viber version 6.0, Rakuten added end-to-end encryption to their service, but only for one-to-one and group conversations in which all participants are using the latest Viber version for Android, iOS, Windows (Win32) or Windows 10 (UWP). The company said that the encryption protocol had only been audited internally, and promised to commission external audits "in the coming weeks". In May 2016, Viber published an overview of their encryption protocol, saying that it is a custom implementation that "uses the same concepts" as the Signal Protocol.

Market share 
, Viber had 800 million registered users. According to Statista, there are 260 million monthly active users as of January 2019. The Viber messenger is very popular in Greece, Eastern Europe, Russia, the Middle East, and some Asian markets.

India was the largest market for Viber as of December 2014 with 33 million registered users, the fifth most popular instant messenger in the country. At the same time there were 30 million users in the United States, 28 million in Russia and 18 million in Brazil. Viber is particularly popular in Eastern Europe, being the most downloaded messaging app on Android in Belarus, Moldova and Ukraine as of 2016. It is also popular in Iraq, Libya and Nepal.

As of 2018, Viber had an over 70 percent penetration rate in the CIS and CEE regions, but only 15 percent in North America.

Russia 
Viber is one of the more popular messenger applications in Russia.
In January 2016, Viber surpassed WhatsApp in Russia, with about 50 million users.

Ukraine
As of September 2021, Viber is Ukraine's most popular messaging app, with a market share of 97.7%. 20% of the company's total messages sent came from Ukraine, where users sent 97.5 billion messages in 2021.

Bulgaria
Viber's market share in Bulgaria is steadily increasing. Reaching a record 90% in 2021. The number of calls made and messages sent via Viber in Bulgaria rose by 11% in 2021, reaching approximately 530 million calls and an average of 400 messages per second, according to data presented by the company.

Greece
As of the end of 2021, over 90% of people in Greece have Viber on their phones, making it the top messaging app in the country.

Serbia
Viber is the top messenger in Serbia. As of November 2021, over 90% of Serbians have Viber on their phone.

Applications

Platforms 

Viber was initially launched for iPhone on 2 December 2010. It was launched on BlackBerry and Windows Phone on 8 May 2012, followed by the Android platform on 19 July 2012, and Nokia's Series 40, Symbian and Samsung's Bada platform on 24 July 2012, by which time the application had 90 million users.

In May 2013 with Viber 3.0, a desktop version for Windows and macOS was released. In August 2013, Viber for Linux was released as a public beta and in August 2014 a final version. In June 2016 a UWP-based desktop application for Windows 10 was released in the Windows Store. The desktop versions are tied with a user's registered Viber mobile number, but can operate independently afterwards. In 2015, a version for the iPad tablet and Apple Watch smartwatch was released.

Features 
Viber was originally launched as a VoIP application for voice calling. On 31 March 2011, Viber 2.0 was released which added instant messaging (IM) capabilities. In July 2012 group messaging and an HD Voice engine were added to both Android and iOS applications. Today, users can send several kinds of media files including photos, videos, GIFs, files, audio messages, and stickers.

Stickers 
In December 2012 Viber added 'stickers' to the application. In October 2013, Viber 4.0 was announced featuring a sticker 'market' where Viber would be selling stickers as a source of revenue.

Viber Out 
In addition, version 4.0 introduced push-to-talk capabilities, and Viber Out, a feature that provides users the option to call mobile and landline numbers via VoIP without the need for the application.

Voice support was officially added for all Windows Phone 8 devices on 2 April 2013. In September 2014, Viber 5.0 was released and introduced video calling.

Public Accounts, Chatbots, and Communities 
In November 2016, Viber version 6.5 launched Public Accounts to allow brands to engage in promotion and customer service on the platform, with initial partners including The Huffington Post, Yandex and The Weather Channel. The app integrates with CRM software and offers chatbot APIs for customer service. Viber Communities, an enhanced group chat feature, was introduced in February 2018. Group calling was introduced with version 10 in February 2019. Communities have an unlimited number of participants, compared to group chats that have a maximum of 250. Viber communities are protective of their users' privacy since neither superadmins nor admins can see members' phone numbers. Also, members who enable private messages can contact each other while keeping their numbers hidden. In October 2020, Viber launched message statistics to go along with Community insights. These statistics offer Community admins the ability to see engagement levels with the content they post to their Communities.

Today, many different kinds of chatbots are also available on the app, including those providing essential information, quizzes, and more.

See also 
 Comparison of cross-platform instant messaging clients
 Comparison of VoIP software

References

External links
 

IOS software
Android (operating system) software
Proprietary cross-platform software
Instant messaging clients
VoIP software
VoIP services
VoIP companies
BlackBerry software
Companies based in Luxembourg City
Windows Phone software
Social media
Symbian software
Rakuten
Israeli companies established in 2010
2010 software
Universal Windows Platform apps
Mergers and acquisitions of Israeli companies
2014 mergers and acquisitions

tk:Viber